Otidea mirabilis is a species of fungus in the family Pyronemataceae. Found in Europe, it was described as new to science in 2001. The flesh is about 1 mm thick, and yellow-brown. The spores are ellipsoid, smooth, contain two oil droplets, and measure 10–14.7 by 6.4–7.2 µm.

References

External links

Fungi described in 2001
Fungi of Europe
Pyronemataceae